Retreat is a town in Navarro County, Texas, United States. The population was 377 at the 2010 census.

Geography

Retreat is located at  (32.051204, –96.474394).

History
Retreat is on Farm Road 709 just south of Corsicana in south central Navarro County. The site was settled in the 1840s and originally known as Beeman's School House. For many years, the log school building, which was also used as a church, was the only church or school in the area. As a result of shifting population, the building was moved more than once. When someone consequently suggested calling the settlement Retreat, the name struck. A public school was in operation by 1900, and in 1906, it had an enrollment of 50. In the mid-1930s, Retreat had a store, a gin, a cemetery, and a number of houses. After World War II, the store closed, but the population in recent years has increased because of the community's proximity to Corsicana. In the mid-1960s, the estimated population was 100; by 1990, it had grown to 334. Most of the residents worked in Corsicana.

Demographics
As of the census of 2000,  339 people, 124 households, and 108 families were residing in the town. The population density was 68.3 people per square mile (26.4/km). The 127 housing units averaged 25.6 per square mile (9.9/km). The racial makeup of the town was 91.45% White, 4.72% African American, 2.65% Pacific Islander, 1.18% from other races. Hispanics or Latinos of any race were 3.54% of the population.

Of the 124 households, 33.9% had children under the age of 18 living with them, 75.8% were married couples living together, 5.6% had a female householder with no husband present, and 12.1% were not families. About 9.7% of all households were made up of individuals, and 5.6% had someone living alone who was 65 years of age or older. The average household size was 2.73, and the average family size was 2.90.

In the town, the population was distributed as 23.9% under the age of 18, 6.8% from 18 to 24, 26.8% from 25 to 44, 34.2% from 45 to 64, and 8.3% who were 65 years of age or older. The median age was 40 years. For every 100 females, there were 103.0 males. For every 100 females age 18 and over, there were 106.4 males.

Males had a median income of $31,250 versus $25,625 for females. The per capita income for the town was $21,308. About 1.9% of families and 6.6% of the population were below the poverty line, including 10.3% of those under age 18 and 7.1% of those age 65 or over.

Education
The Town of Retreat is served by the Corsicana Independent School District.

References

Further reading
 Annie Carpenter Love, History of Navarro County (Dallas: Southwestern, 1933)
 Wyvonne Putman, comp., Navarro County History (4 vols., Quanah, Texas: Nortex, 1975–84)
 Alva Taylor, History and Photographs of Corsicana and Navarro County (Corsicana, Texas, 1959; rev. ed., Navarro County History and Photographs, Corsicana, 1962)

External links
 Retreat Fire Department

Towns in Navarro County, Texas
Towns in Texas
Populated places established in the 1840s